Exosite is an Internet of Things (IoT)  software as a service company that develops software for companies that view and analyze data collected from sensors built into physical objects. It is headquartered in Minneapolis, Minnesota with additional offices in Taiwan, Hungary and Texas. Hans Rempel, Troy Kopischke and Danny Cunagin founded the company in 2009 and Rempel is Exosite's chief executive officer. The company held a $2 million series A funding round in 2012.

In 2014, the company partnered with Texas Instruments to offer its cloud-based IoT platform on Texas Instruments' LaunchPad series microcontrollers.

In May 2019, Exosite announced a collaboration with Sigfox, a global communications service provider, to launch Sigfox Service, an integration between the Sigfox backend and Exosite's Murano IoT software platform.

References

External links
Official site

Chinese Official site

Companies based in Minneapolis
Internet of things companies